Palmoplantar ectodermal dysplasia is a cutaneous condition.

Types include:

 Palmoplantar ectodermal dysplasia type 1 or Pachyonychia congenita type I
 Palmoplantar ectodermal dysplasia type 3 or Acrokeratoelastoidosis
 Palmoplantar ectodermal dysplasia type 4 or Papillon–Lefèvre syndrome
 Palmoplantar ectodermal dysplasia type 5 or Tyrosinemia type II
 Palmoplantar ectodermal dysplasia type 6 or Olmsted syndrome
 Palmoplantar ectodermal dysplasia type 8 or Meleda disease

See also
 Ectodermal dysplasia

References

Palmoplantar keratodermas